Marc Hansen may refer to:
 Marc Hansen (cartoonist), American cartoonist
 Marc Hansen (politician), Luxembourgish politician

See also
 Mark Hansen (disambiguation)